An Election to the Edinburgh Corporation was held on 4 May 1965, alongside municipal elections across Scotland. Of the councils 69 seats, 23 were up for election.

After the election Edinburgh Corporation was composed of 35 Progressives, 33 Labour councillors, and 2 Liberal. The Progressives gained control of the council, which had previously been under no overall control.

Aggregate results

Ward Results

References

1965
1965 Scottish local elections